Lisa Dillon (née Stawiarski; born 1979) is an English actress.

Life and career

Early life
Dillon attended Bournemouth School for Girls and left in 1997. She began a degree in English Literature and Drama at Royal Holloway, University of London but abandoned it when she won a place at the Royal Academy of Dramatic Art (RADA).

Theatre
Whilst training at RADA, Dillon appeared in several productions staged there, including: Hamlet and The Tempest by William Shakespeare, The Devils by John Whiting, The Devil's Law Case by John Webster, Yentl by Leah Napolin and The Playboy of the Western World by J. M. Synge. Her first theatrical job after graduation was the title role in Euripides' Iphigeneia at Aulis at the Crucible Theatre, Sheffield.

She then went on to appear in numerous theatre productions, including as Hilda Wangel in The Master Builder by Henrik Ibsen at the Albery Theatre, (now the Noël Coward Theatre) London. Desdemona in Othello (with the RSC at the Trafalgar Studios, London, before embarking on an international tour). Ibsen's Hedda Gabler as Thea (Almeida Theatre, London, later transferring to the Duke of York's Theatre, London) and Period of Adjustment by Tennessee Williams (The Swan Theatre, Stratford-upon-Avon later transferring to the Almeida Theatre, London.)

In 2007, she returned to the Crucible to play Celia in Shakespeare's As You Like It during February (in a production that also played at the RSC complete works festival) and Varya in Chekhov's The Cherry Orchard during March. She then starred in the National Theatre's revival of Noël Coward's Present Laughter and The Hour We Knew Nothing of Each Other. She also appeared in Anna Mackmin's 2008 West End revival of Under the Blue Sky by David Eldridge.

In 2009, Dillon starred in When the Rain Stops Falling at the Almeida, and in 2010 in Design for Living and its successor production A Flea In Her Ear at the Old Vic. Eldridge created the role of Lucy in The Knot of the Heart, presented at the Almeida in March 2011, specifically for Dillon. In early 2012, Dillon played the role of Katharina in the Royal Shakespeare Company (RSC) Stratford and touring production of The Taming of the Shrew. In 2013, she starred with Joel Samuels and William Troughton in Happy New (written by Brendan Cowell) and performed in London's West End.

In 2014, she starred as Moll Cutpurse in The Roaring Girl with the RSC. In December 2015 she took the title role in Hapgood for director Howard Davies at the Hampstead Theatre.

Television
Dillon is now best known for her role as Mary Smith in the British television series Cranford on BBC One where she starred alongside Michael Gambon, Imelda Staunton, Jim Carter and Judi Dench. She also starred in the 2003 drama Cambridge Spies and the 2004 TV film, Hawking, both of which were also for the BBC. She appeared in The Jury (ITV) in autumn 2011 and appeared as Melinda in the third episode of Dirk Gently for BBC Four in March 2012.

Film
Dillon's film credits include the Stephen Fry directed 2003 film Bright Young Things.

Music
In 2008 Dillon duetted with British singer-songwriter Tim Arnold on his song "She's Made A Gentleman Of Me".

Radio
In 2011 Dillon read a Jarvis and Ayres production of Hilda Richards' 1939 story "Jemima Gets Them Guessing" for BBC Radio 4's Afternoon Reading show, on 9 March.

She has undertaken the following roles in productions by Jarvis and Ayres for BBC Radio 4 of:
Honey Ryder in "Dr. No" on 24/5/2008;
Tilly Masterson in "Goldfinger" on 3/4/2010;
Tracy Draco in "On Her Majesty's Secret Service" on 3/5/2014;
Tiffany Case in "Diamonds are Forever"" on 25/7/15 and
Patricia Fearing in "Thunderball" on 10/12/2016.

Awards
In 2003 she was nominated for the Evening Standard Award for Outstanding Newcomer of the Year for the performance she gave in a production of Ibsen's The Master Builder. She won that year's Ian Charleson Award, in part, for that performance.

References

External links

 

1979 births
Living people
Actresses from Coventry
Alumni of RADA
Critics' Circle Theatre Award winners
English stage actresses
English television actresses
English film actresses
English radio actresses
English people of Polish descent
Royal Shakespeare Company members
English Shakespearean actresses
21st-century English actresses
Ian Charleson Award winners